Bowdler, a prominent Shropshire family descended from Baldwin de Boulers.

People with the given name Bowdler

 George Bowdler Buckton (1818–1905), English entomologist
 Richard Bowdler Sharpe (1847–1909), English zoologist

People with the surname Bowdler

Writers
 Elizabeth Stuart Bowdler (? - 1797), English religious writer
 Henrietta Maria Bowdler (1750–1830), writer and expurgator of Shakespeare, sister of Jane, John and Thomas Bowdler
 Jane Bowdler (1743–1784), poet and essayist and sister of John, Thomas and Henrietta Bowdler
John Bowdler (1746-1823), moral reformer and brother of Henrietta and Thomas Bowdler
John Bowdler the Younger (1783-1815), essayist, poet and lawyer, son of John Bowdler
 Thomas Bowdler (1754–1825), English physician, publisher and editor of the Family Shakespeare (1818), inspiration of the term bowdlerisation
Thomas Bowdler the Younger (1782-1856), Church of England priest and nephew and editor of Thomas Bowdler

Sportsmen
 Cal Bowdler (born 1977), retired American basketball player
 Charles Bowdler (1785-1879), English cricketer
 Ernie Bowdler (1872–1921), Shrewsbury Town F.C. and Wales international footballer
 Jack Bowdler (1870–1927), Shrewsbury Town F.C., Wolverhampton Wanderers F.C. and Wales international footballer
 Lonza Bowdler, Welsh international rugby player

Politicians
 Audley Bowdler (1884-1969), English politician
 William G. Bowdler (1924-2016), American diplomat

Other
 Emily Mary Bowdler Sharpe (1868-1920), English entomologist
 Sandra Bowdler, Australian archaeologist

Places
 Ashford Bowdler, a village in Shropshire, England
 Ashford Bowdler railway station, railway station in Ashford Bowdler
 Hope Bowdler, a village in Shropshire, England

See also 
 Hen Domen the Bowdler family seat

External links

 Genealogy and History of the Bowdler Family

Surnames